Greensville County Courthouse Complex is a historic courthouse complex located at South Main Street (US 301) between Hicksford Avenue and Spring Street in Emporia, Virginia. The three contributing buildings are the two-story, porticoed courthouse built in 1834, the clerk's office built in 1894, and the former Greensville Bank Building, now the county administrator's office, in 1900 and 1907. The courthouse originally took a Palladian form, but was remodeled between 1907 and 1910 to take a Beaux-Arts appearance.  The clerk's office was considerably enlarged in 1916 and the Georgian-style facade added in 1961. The interior of the county administrator's office features elaborate pressed-tin walls and ceilings manufactured by the local concern, H.J. Klugel. The buildings are set upon the courthouse square, which includes a cannon honoring residents who participated in World War I, and a Confederate monument.

It was listed on the National Register of Historic Places in 1983. The complex is also located within the Hicksford–Emporia Historic District.

References

External links

County courthouses in Virginia
Courthouses on the National Register of Historic Places in Virginia
Federal architecture in Virginia
Beaux-Arts architecture in Virginia
Colonial Revival architecture in Virginia
Government buildings completed in 1834
Buildings and structures in Emporia, Virginia
National Register of Historic Places in Emporia, Virginia
1834 establishments in Virginia
Individually listed contributing properties to historic districts on the National Register in Virginia